ONE Fight Night 7: Lineker vs. Andrade 2 was a Combat sport event produced by ONE Championship that took place on February 25, 2023, at Lumpinee Boxing Stadium in Bangkok, Thailand.

Background
The event was originally scheduled on February 11 at Jakarta Convention Center in Jakarta, Indonesia to host the event. However, the event was moved to Lumpinee Boxing Stadium in Bangkok, Thailand and took place on February 25.

A ONE Bantamweight World Championship rematch for the vacant title between former champion John Lineker and #1 ranked contender Fabrício Andrade served as the event headliner. The pairing previously met at ONE on Prime Video 3 in October 2022, Lineker was stripped of the title when he missed weight for his attempted title defense, where the bout ended in a no contest due to an accidental groin strike rendered Lineker unable to continue during the third round.

A ONE Featherweight Muay Thai World Championship bout between current champion Tawanchai P.K.Saenchai and Jamal Yusupov served as the event's co-headliner.

A featherweight bout between former ONE Featherweight and Lightweight World Champion Martin Nguyen and Shamil Gasanov was scheduled for this event. However, Gasanov was forced to withdraw due to an infection that stemmed from an injury. He was replaced by promotional newcomer Razhab Shaydullaev. In turn, Shaydullaev was forced to withdraw due to undisclosed reasons and was replaced by Leonardo Casotti.

Results

Bonus awards 
The following fighters received $50,000 bonuses.

Performance of the Night: Tawanchai P.K.Saenchai and Tommy Langaker

See also 

 2023 in ONE Championship
 List of ONE Championship events
 List of current ONE fighters

References 

Events in Bangkok
ONE Championship events
2023 in mixed martial arts
Mixed martial arts in Thailand
Sports competitions in Thailand
February 2023 sports events in Thailand